The 1976–77 English Hockey League season took place from September 1976 until May 1977.

The Men's Cup was won by Slough.

The Men's National Inter League Championship brought together the winners of their respective regional leagues. The championship (held in September 1977) was won by Southgate.

As from the 1980-81 season the National Inter League Championship would be held in the spring of the same season instead of the Autumn of the following season.

Men's Courage National Inter League Championship 
(Held at Aston University Grounds, Birmingham, September 10–11)

Group A

Group B

Final 

Southgate
David Owen, Nigel Woolven, Howard Manton, A Wallace, Geoffrey Hitchens, Raj Rawal, David Whitaker, Bernie Cotton, Peter Hazell, Alistair McGinn, James Neale
Bedfordshire Eagles
R Tatman, M Blake, H Dharml, M Kavanagh, Brajinder Daved, P Goodyear, P Ellis, M Ganesh, T Sharma, Benawra Singh, G Player

Men's Cup (Benson & Hedges National Clubs Championship)

Quarter-finals

Semi-finals

Final 
(Held at Slough Hockey Club on 1 May)

Slough
Ian Taylor, John Brindley, Mike Parris, Andy Churcher, John Allen, John Murdock, Sutinder Singh Khehar, Pami Saini, Stuart Collins, Balwant Saini, D S Earl (Partington sub)
Beckenham
S Port, B N Mills, R Fell, M B Swayne, B J Green, I Westwood, C Rule, A Matheson (P Taylor sub), J Armour (A Page sub), I S McIntosh, P Anderson

References 

1976
field hockey
field hockey
1977 in field hockey
1976 in field hockey